D’Mitch Davis (born July 15, 1941) is an American actor and musician best known for his roles as the Axminster in the 1990s TV show MacGyver, and the Bartender in the 1985 film Weird Science.

Filmography

Discography
 Ageless (2010)

References

External links
 
 Ageless 2010 Album on Amazon

1941 births
Living people
African-American male actors
American male film actors
20th-century African-American male singers
American male singer-songwriters
American male television actors
American singer-songwriters
African-American songwriters
21st-century African-American people
People from Shreveport, Louisiana